Alonzo Nute (February 12, 1826 – December 24, 1892) was a United States representative from New Hampshire.  He was born in Milton, New Hampshire where he attended the common schools. He moved to Natick, Massachusetts in 1842 but returned to New Hampshire in 1848 and engaged in the manufacture of boots and shoes in Farmington. In the spring of 1861, he entered the Union Army in the 6th New Hampshire Infantry Regiment during the Civil War.

Nute served as a member of the New Hampshire House of Representatives in 1866 after the war. He also served in the New Hampshire Senate in 1867 and 1868. In addition, he was a delegate to the Republican National Convention in 1876. He was elected as a Republican to the Fifty-first Congress (March 4, 1889 – March 3, 1891) but was not a candidate for renomination in 1890. He died in Farmington in 1892 and was buried in Pine Grove Cemetery.

References

1826 births
1892 deaths
Republican Party New Hampshire state senators
Republican Party members of the New Hampshire House of Representatives
People from Milton, New Hampshire
People of New Hampshire in the American Civil War
Union Army soldiers
Republican Party members of the United States House of Representatives from New Hampshire
People from Farmington, New Hampshire
19th-century American politicians